The Adobe Range is a minor mountain range of Nevada.

The vegetation of the range is primarily sagebrush steppe. Various intermittent creeks feed the Humboldt River, which borders the range to the south and east.

Ownership is about half private, and half Bureau of Land Management. Suburbs of Elko back up to the southern part of the Adobes, where the ski area Elko Snobowl is located. Several coal mines are to be found in the northern part of the range.

The Adobe Range is a newly developed climbing area, with routes on conglomerate rock ranging from YDS 5.6 to 5.10.

References

Sources
 

Mountain ranges of Nevada
Range, Adobe
Mountain ranges of Elko County, Nevada